Emmanuel Kwasi Bandua (born 11 September 1949) is a Ghanaian lawyer and politician. He was the member of parliament that represented Biakoye constituency in the Volta region of Ghana in the Fourth and Fifth and Sixth parliament of the Fourth Republic of Ghana.

Personal life 
Bandua is married with three children. He is a Christian.

Early life and education 
Bandua was born on 11 September 1949. He hails from Bowiri-Anyinase in the Volta region of Ghana. He obtained his Bachelor of Arts degree in Economics and Sociology.  He obtained a diploma in Education from the University of Cape Coast in 1980. He is also an alumnus of Ghana School of Law where he obtained his Bachelor of Law degree in 1990.

Political career 
Bandua is a member of the National Democratic Congress. He was first elected into office in the 2004 Ghanaian general election obtaining 16,083 votes out of 24,207 valid votes in his Constituency. He represented his constituency until 6 January 2017. He was a committee member of Business, Foreign Affairs, Lands and Forestry.

Employment 
Bandua is a lawyer. He was the Deputy Chief Manager of Bank of Ghana. He has been MP since January 2005.

Committee 
He was a member of committee for business, foreign affairs, Lands and forestry.

References 

Living people
People from Volta Region
National Democratic Congress (Ghana) politicians
University of Cape Coast alumni
1949 births
Ghanaian MPs 2005–2009
Ghanaian MPs 2009–2013
Ghanaian MPs 2013–2017
20th-century Ghanaian lawyers